Shakhban Kurbanov is a Russian Paralympic judoka. He represented Russia at the 2008 Summer Paralympics and at the 2012 Summer Paralympics and he won the bronze medal in the men's 73 kg event in 2012.

He won the silver medal in the men's 70 kg event at the 2015 IBSA World Games.

References

External links 
 

Living people
Year of birth missing (living people)
Place of birth missing (living people)
Russian male judoka
Judoka at the 2008 Summer Paralympics
Judoka at the 2012 Summer Paralympics
Medalists at the 2012 Summer Paralympics
Paralympic bronze medalists for Russia
Paralympic medalists in judo
Paralympic judoka of Russia
21st-century Russian people